Dhruv Kapila (born 1 February 2000) is an Indian badminton player. He was the gold medalists at the 2019 South Asian Games in the men's doubles, mixed doubles and team events. He was part of the India team that won the 2022 Thomas Cup.

Achievements

South Asian Games 
Men's doubles

Mixed doubles

BWF International Challenge/Series (2 titles, 3 runners-up) 
Men's doubles

  BWF International Challenge tournament
  BWF International Series tournament
  BWF Future Series tournament

BWF Junior International (3 runners-up) 
Boys' doubles

  BWF Junior International Grand Prix tournament
  BWF Junior International Challenge tournament
  BWF Junior International Series tournament
  BWF Junior Future Series tournament

Performance timeline

National team 
 Senior level

References

External links 
 

Living people
2000 births
Indian male badminton players
South Asian Games gold medalists for India
South Asian Games medalists in badminton